Saulus saga ok Nikanors (also known as Sálus saga og Nikanors) is a medieval Icelandic romance saga.

Synopsis 

Kalinke and Mitchell summarise the saga thus:

Composed in Iceland, presumably in the fourteenth century. After a duel nearly to the death as a result of a chess game at the court of the Roman emperor, Prince Sálus of Galicia and Duke Nikanor of Bár become blood brothers and are involved in a series of tremendous battles in order to obtain Potentiana, Nikanor's sister, as Sálus' bride. Nikanor ultimately marries Luneta, daughter of King Benjamin of Akaia in Grikkland. There are many classical and Biblical elements and allusions.

Manuscripts 

Kalinke and Mitchell identified the following manuscripts of the saga:

Derived rímur 
Finnur Sigmundsson's catalogue of rímur lists three different rímur based on the saga which Finnur knew in manuscripts in public collections, and reports rumours of six lost rímur on the subject. The oldest is Sálus rímur og Níkanórs, dated to the first half of the fifteenth century by Haukur Þorgeirsson; the poem comprises 593 stanzas in eleven rímur and was edited by Finnur Jónsson.

Sample of Sálus rímur og Níkanórs

Editions and translations 
 H. Erlendsson & Einar Þórðarson, eds. "Sagan af Salusi og Nikanor", in Fjórar riddarasögur (Reykjavik, 1852), pp. 34-92. Machine-readable text here. [Popular reading edition.]
 Agnete Loth (ed.), Late Medieval Icelandic Romances, Editiones Arnamagæanae, series B, 20–24, 5 vols (Copenhagen: Munksgaard, 1962–65), II, 3-91. [The principal scholarly edition.]

References 

Chivalric sagas
Icelandic literature
Old Norse literature